Zerbe may refer to:

Surname
The name Zerbe may come from the German town of Zerben.
Anthony Zerbe (born 1936), American actor
Chad Zerbe (born 1972), American MLB player
Christina Zerbe (born 1980), German footballer
Farran Zerbe (1871–1949), American numismatist
Hannes Zerbe (born 1941), German jazz musician
Jerome Zerbe (1904-1988), American photographer
Karl Zerbe (1903–1972), German-American painter
Volker Zerbe (born 1968), German handball player and manager

Places
Zerbe Township, Northumberland County, Pennsylvania, town in central Pennsylvania
Zerbe Run, stream in central Pennsylvania

Other
 Zerbe Air Sedan, passenger aircraft project
 Zerbe Sextuplane, an early aircraft design
 The ANA Distinguished Service Award, formerly called the Farran Zerbe Memorial Award

See also
 Zerbes (disambiguation)

German-language surnames
German toponymic surnames